Mulambwa Santulu (born Maimbolwa Santulu) was the 10th litunga (king) of Barotseland who ruled from 1780 to 1830. He is one of the most fondly remembered Luyana kings. He is famous for introducing a series of reforms such as a new constitution into the Lozi Kingdom. He has been called "Mulambwa Mutomi Wa Mulao" which translates to "Mulambwa the creator of laws." 

During this period, the practice of slave trading affiliated with both Arab and Portuguese markets was gradually expanding from the coastal regions into the African interior. The name 'Mulambwa' was acquired as a nickname based on his tough stance against slave trading. It is derived from the phrase "Muule ambwa, Muulese kuule Anu" which translates to "buy dogs, but not another human being." Barotseland was made a no-go area for slave traders. 

His reign is also characterised by the arrival of the Mbunda tribe into Barotseland, who had fled Angola as refugees escaping slave trading. They were welcomed to resettle into his kingdom and would become strong allies.

Biography
Mulambwa Santulu was the third son of the king Mwanawina I, by his wife, Queen Mbuywana.

He was a chief of Lilundu, before his accession. He succeeded on the death of his elder brother Mwananyanda Liwale and was opposed by Kusiyo, but eventually triumphed after slaying the Nololo. He established his capital at Namuso and established orchards, tamed and domesticated wild animals and promulgated laws on property and marriage. He died at Lilundu, in the month of July, about 1830. Under his reign, the Mbunda tribe who had fled Angola as refugees fleeing the slave trade were allowed to settle in Barotseland.

Family
Mulambwa had many children. His sons were kings Mubukwanu and Silumelume and his grandson was Sipopa Lutangu.

His children were also Namiluko Mulumbwa, Imbua Mulumbwa (chief), Ilukuyi, Meebelo Ananganga Mulumbwa, PNgela Mulumbwa, Yeta II, and Akelumbela.

His daughters were Kandundu (Mulena Mukwai of Nololo, she died in 1871), Monambeza (installed as Mulena Mukwai of Nololo, she was killed in 1885) and Katoka.

References

Litungas
1830 deaths
Year of birth unknown
Year of death uncertain